Winterborne may refer to:

Winterborne Came, Dorset, England
Winterborne Clenston, Dorset
Winterborne Farringdon, Dorset
Winterborne Herringston, Dorset
Winterborne Houghton, Dorset
Winterborne Kingston, Dorset
Winterborne Monkton, Dorset
Winterborne Muston, Dorset
Winterborne St Martin, Dorset
Winterborne Stickland, Dorset
Winterborne Tomson, Dorset
Winterborne Whitechurch, Dorset
Winterborne Zelston, Dorset

See also
Winterbourne (disambiguation)
Winterborn (disambiguation)